Siddamulla South Grama Niladhari Division is a  Grama Niladhari Division of the  Homagama Divisional Secretariat  of Colombo District  of Western Province, Sri Lanka .  It has Grama Niladhari Division Code 591B.

Siddamulla South is a surrounded by the  Sangharama, Siddamulla North, Pelenwatta East, Mattegoda West, Gorakapitiya and Pelenwatta North  Grama Niladhari Divisions.

Demographics

Ethnicity 

The Siddamulla South Grama Niladhari Division has  a Sinhalese majority (98.9%) . In comparison, the Homagama Divisional Secretariat (which contains the Siddamulla South Grama Niladhari Division) has  a Sinhalese majority (98.1%)

Religion 

The Siddamulla South Grama Niladhari Division has  a Buddhist majority (95.6%) . In comparison, the Homagama Divisional Secretariat (which contains the Siddamulla South Grama Niladhari Division) has  a Buddhist majority (96.2%)

References 

Grama Niladhari Divisions of Homagama Divisional Secretariat